John Norman Haynes (17 October 1934 – 18 October 2005) was an English association footballer who played as an inside forward. He made 56 appearances for his country including 22 as captain. He was selected for three World Cup finals squads playing in the latter two of those. Nicknamed "the Maestro", his attacking play was noted for two-footed passing ability, vision and deftness of touch. Haynes is widely regarded as Fulham's greatest ever player, remaining loyal there for twenty years despite coming no nearer to a major trophy win than two FA Cup semi-final appearances. Immediately following the abolition of the £20 maximum wage in 1961, he became the first player to be paid £100 a week. He also had a spell on loan with Toronto City in 1961 and ended his playing days at Durban City, winning there the only trophy he won in his football career.

Playing career

The son of a post office engineer, Haynes was born in Kentish Town and supported Arsenal as a boy. He signed for Fulham as a 15-year-old amateur in 1950 when Fulham were in a three-season spell in the First Division. He was loaned to then non-League Wimbledon. He made his senior debut aged 18 in the 1952 Boxing Day visit of Southampton to Fulham, then in their first season back in the Second Division.

Haynes made his debut for England in October 1954, scoring a goal in a 2–0 victory over Northern Ireland in Belfast. He first captained England in 1960 and played for them in two World Cups.

He was one of many signatories of a letter to The Times on 17 July 1958 opposing "the policy of apartheid" in international sport and defending "the principle of racial equality which is embodied in the Declaration of the Olympic Games".

Haynes played in his first of two FA Cup semi-finals in 1958. Fulham were eliminated in a replay by the remnants of Manchester United's Busby Babes team that had been devastated by the Munich air disaster the month before. United were the first top-division team Fulham played in that cup run. Fulham were promoted to the top division after finishing runners-up behind Sheffield Wednesday in 1959. In the 1959–60 season, Fulham finished 10th in the First Division, which was their highest league position until finishing 9th in the 2003–04 Premier League season. Following the abolition of the £20 maximum wage in 1961, he became Britain's first footballer to earn £100 per week. He played in a second FA Cup semi-final in 1962, losing in a replay to Burnley. In 1961, during the English off-season, he played abroad in the Eastern Canada Professional Soccer League with Toronto City.

In August 1962 on Blackpool promenade, the sports car in which he was returning late to his hotel was blown by a gust of wind into the path of another vehicle. Haynes suffered broken bones in both feet and a badly injured knee. He recounted that the police officer who attended the incident reassured him by saying "Don't worry son, you've only broken your legs". He missed almost the entire season and, when he returned to the Fulham side, was not quite the same player. Prior to the accident, he had captained England 22 times, and, being only 27, was expected to lead them in the 1966 FIFA World Cup, but he was never again selected for the national team.

Fulham were relegated in 1968. Haynes then had a single spell in football management, taking charge of Fulham for eighteen days in November that year after the dismissal of Bobby Robson as player-manager, but Haynes never had any ambition to go into coaching. That season, Fulham endured a second successive relegation. His last appearance for Fulham's first team was on 17 January 1970 in a Third Division home match against Stockport County. In total, he made 657 appearances for Fulham and scored 157 goals.

In 1970, Haynes announced his retirement, aged 35, and joined Durban City, playing one season and winning South Africa's 1970–71 National Football League. This was his only winner's medal in senior football. During the 1972–73 season, Haynes made three league appearances for non-League club Wealdstone.

Post-playing career
On retiring from playing in 1970 he was already an active bookmaker. He sold his chain of bookmakers to The Tote in 1976. In 1985 he moved to Edinburgh, the city of his partner Avril. Haynes first met Avril in the 1960s when she travelled down to London to buy stock for boutiques she ran in Edinburgh. On moving to Edinburgh he ran a laundry business with Avril, played golf and watched local club, Heart of Midlothian. In 2004 he and Avril married in a private ceremony at Dalkeith registry office.

Death
On 17 October 2005, his 71st birthday, Haynes was driving his car, with Avril as passenger, on Edinburgh's Dalry Road when he suffered a brain haemorrhage, instantaneously effectively rendering him brain-dead. The vehicle veered across the road and crashed into a van. After being kept on a ventilator for some 30 hours, the ventilator was turned off on the evening of 18 October 2005. The funeral at Mortonhall Crematorium was attended by ex-players Bobby Charlton, George Cohen, Sven-Göran Eriksson, Dave Mackay, Alan Mullery, Jimmy Murray and Bobby Robson, and also George Foulkes. Avril was unable to attend due to injuries from the car accident. Haynes was survived by Avril and his stepchildren Mark and Sara.

Tributes

In 2002 Haynes became an inaugural inductee into the English Football Hall of Fame in recognition of his football talents and impact on the English game.

On the day of Haynes' death, Alan Mullery, another ex-Fulham and England player, made the following tribute:
"He was the only reason I went to Fulham as a young boy of 15 leaving school. He was my hero, the captain of England and Fulham. The word great rolls off the tongue quite easily these days but he really was. He was the best passer of a ball I have ever seen - I don't know anyone who could pass a ball as accurately. Anyone who saw him will know what a great player he was."

Shortly after his death, the Stevenage Road Stand at Craven Cottage was renamed The Johnny Haynes Stand.
 

George Cohen, a World Cup winner for England in 1966 and a Fulham teammate of Johnny Haynes, stated:
"I have a hundred individual memories of the beauty of John's play. One stands out for the sheer perfection of his skill. It was a charity match which, but for that one second, has faded completely from my memory. The ball came to him at speed on a wet, slippery surface but with the slightest of adjustments, one that was almost imperceptible, he played it inside a full-back and into the path of an on-running winger. I looked at our coach Dave Sexton on the bench and he caught my glance and shook his head as if to say 'fantastic'. Haynes could give you goose bumps on a wet night in a match that didn't matter."

Bobby Moore, England captain from 1964 to 1973, said of him: "Once you get used to watching that perfection you realised the rest of the secret. John was always available, always hungry for the ball, always wanting to play. I loved watching the player. Later I learnt to love the man." Pelé said he had "never seen a better passer of the ball" than Haynes.

The Fulham Supporters Trust stated: "His dedication, skill, professionalism, grace and charm - both in his playing days and in retirement - serve as a poignant reminder to many of today's footballers about what true greatness really means." On 28 July 2008, Fulham announced that fundraising had commenced, with the co-operation of a fan's group, to produce a lasting tribute to Haynes. The Johnny Haynes Statue was unveiled outside the stadium before the 0–0 draw v Sunderland on Saturday 18 October 2008.

Career statistics

Club

International

Honours

Durban City
 National Football League: 1970–71

Individual
 Ballon d'Or Bronze Award: 1961
 Football League 100 Legends: 1998
 Member of English Football Hall of Fame: 2002

Bibliography

 Brown, Geoff and Hogsbjerg, Christian. Apartheid is not a Game: Remembering the Stop the Seventy Tour campaign. London: Redwords, 2020. .

References

External links

 Haynes' Post War English & Scottish Football League A - Z Player's Transfer Database profile's statistics site
 
 
 Pathe newsreel footage of Johnny Haynes hattrick for England against Russia
 Brian Glanville: Silent fans pay tribute to their midfield maestro (subscription required)
 Memories of Craven Cottage

 
 

1934 births
2005 deaths
English footballers
England international footballers
England under-23 international footballers
English football managers
Fulham F.C. players
1954 FIFA World Cup players
1958 FIFA World Cup players
1962 FIFA World Cup players
English Football League players
Association football inside forwards
English Football Hall of Fame inductees
People educated at The Latymer School
Feltham F.C. (1946) players
Wimbledon F.C. players
Toronto City players
People from Kentish Town
London XI players
English Football League representative players
Wealdstone F.C. players
Durban City F.C. players
Eastern Canada Professional Soccer League players
Road incident deaths in Scotland
National Football League (South Africa) players